Rhododendron campanulatum, the bell-flowered rhododendron or bell rhododendron, is a species of flowering plant in the family Ericaceae, native to the Himalayas and Tibet. It is the state flower of Himachal Pradesh. It is an evergreen shrub to a small tree. Leaves are ovate or broadly elliptic. Flowers bloom from April-May and are white to lavender in color.

References

campanulatum
Flora of West Himalaya
Flora of Nepal
Flora of East Himalaya
Flora of Tibet
Plants described in 1821